Yuri Valeryevich Dubrovin (born 10 September 1984) is a Russian former professional footballer.

Club career
He made his Russian Football National League debut for FC Krasnodar on 28 March 2009 in a game against FC Shinnik Yaroslavl.

External links
 
 

1984 births
Sportspeople from Kaluga
Living people
Russian footballers
Association football midfielders
Russian expatriate footballers
Expatriate footballers in Belarus
FC Darida Minsk Raion players
FC Lada-Tolyatti players
FC Tyumen players
FC Krasnodar players
FC Luch Vladivostok players
FC Fakel Voronezh players
FC Dynamo Saint Petersburg players